Under the Hawthorn Tree is 2010 Chinese film directed by Zhang Yimou. It was adapted from the popular 2007 novel Hawthorn Tree Forever by Ai Mi, which was based on a true story set during the Cultural Revolution. The film was released in Mainland China (September 2010), Hong Kong (November 2010) and Singapore (February 2011).

Plot 
Set during the end of China's Cultural Revolution in a small village in Yichang City, Hubei Province, China, this film is about a pure love that develops between a beautiful high school student, Zhang Jing Qiu, and a handsome young prospector named Lao San (which means the third child in a family). Jing Qiu is one of the "educated youth" sent to be "re-educated" through work in the countryside under a directive from Chairman Mao Zedong.

She arrives with a group in Xiping village, in the Yangtze River's Three Gorges region, where they are shown a hawthorn tree called the Tree of Heroes which was reputedly nourished by the blood of Chinese martyrs executed by the Japanese during World War II. Jing Qiu is lodged with the family of village head, where she meets geology student Sun Jianxin (nicknamed Lao San), who also takes his meals at Zhang's home, and she's drawn to his responsible and honorable character.

Lao San's father held a high position in the military, but his mother committed suicide four years ago after being branded as a "rightist". Jing Qiu's father was also a political prisoner somewhere in China and her mother, branded as a "capitalist", was reduced to menial work to support their family. Following the political persecution of her father, Jing Qiu lived with her mother and little siblings, working towards becoming a teacher to support her family.

Despite the fact that this could endanger the future of Jing Qiu and her family, Jing Qiu and Lao San fell in love and their relationship continues the following year. Lao San also promised to wait for her until she grew up. Jing Qiu was torn between her feelings for Lao San and her filial duty to her family.

However, Lao San later developed leukemia and forced himself to leave Jing Qiu. Jing Qiu, without knowing about Lao San's deadly disease, was only reunited with him when he was dying in hospital. The film closed with Jing Qiu tearfully calling to the unconscious Lao San, repeatedly saying "I am Jing Qiu, I am Jing Qiu."

Cast
 Zhou Dongyu as Jing Qiu
 Shawn Dou as Lao San (Jianxin)		
Xi Meijuan as Jing Qiu's mother
Jiang Ruijia as Wei Hong, Jing Qiu's friend
 Lü Liping as Wei Hong's mother
 Chen Xingxu as Lao San's brother
 Sun Haiying as Lao San's father

Production

History
This film is based on the novel Hawthorn Tree Forever which was written by renowned author Aimi and it was inspired by the real-life story of her friend, Jing. Zhang Yimou decided to bring the story to the big screen after being moved by the novel.

Release
The film debuted in the 15th Busan International Film Festival on 7 October 2010. It was then released in Mainland China on 15 September 2010 and in Hong Kong on 11 November 2010. It was also released on 10 February 2011 in Singapore cinemas.

Reception

Critical reception
My Paper said that "Dou and Zhou bring a touching believability to this tale of young love" and rated this film 3.5 stars. Pusan International Film Festival website stated that "He renders it as something now tainted under the weight of age and ever-changing worlds. In an unbelievably delicate observance... Zhang expresses his view of innocence in a soft, almost feminine, approach. Also ... he successfully draws enticing portrayals of innocence from Zhou Dongyu and Dou Xiao. ... Zhang Yimou appears to reclaim his own innocence as a youthful creator. "  Kaori Shoji of The Japan Times gave the film 4 out of 5 stars, and describes it as a  "tearjerker aims for the heart".

Box office
The film grossed ¥148 million in China.

Film festivals

References

External links
 Under the Hawthorn Tree at Hong Kong Film Festival 
 
 

2010 films
2010s Mandarin-language films
Films directed by Zhang Yimou
Films about the Cultural Revolution
Films based on Chinese novels
Chinese romantic drama films